Lionel Couch (1913–1989) was a British art director. He was nominated for two Academy Awards in the category Best Art Direction.

Selected filmography
Couch was nominated for two Academy Awards for Best Art Direction:
 Sons and Lovers (1960)
 Anne of the Thousand Days (1969)

References

External links

1913 births
1989 deaths
British art directors